The Troubles of an Heiress is a 1914 British silent comedy film directed by Sidney Northcote and starring Miss Normand, M. Gray Murray and Vera Northcote. It was produced by the British and Colonial Kinematograph Company.

Cast
 Miss Normand - Diana Coney
 M. Gray Murray - Lord Painkurst
 Vera Northcote - The Kandy Kid
 Mr. Billington - Mark Coney

References

External links

1914 films
1914 comedy films
Films directed by Sidney Northcote
British silent short films
British comedy films
British black-and-white films
1910s English-language films
1910s British films
Silent comedy films